Dominik Veselovský (born 19 July 2002) is a Slovak footballer who plays for DAC Dunajská Streda of the Fortuna Liga as an midfielder.

Club career

DAC Dunajská Streda
Veselovský made his professional Fortuna Liga debut for DAC in an away fixture against ViOn Zlaté Moravce on 21 July 2019. Veselovský was fielded in the 64th minute as a tactical substitute, replacing Danylo Beskorovainyi, with the role of strengthening the offence and equalising the game as DAC was one down, following a first-half goal by Denis Duga. Within five minutes Zsolt Kalmár scored the equaliser and secured three points late in the second half. DAC won 2:1.

International career
Veselovský enjoyed his first Slovakia U21 national team recognition on 17 March 2022 under Jaroslav Kentoš ahead of two 2023 Under-21 European Championship qualifiers against Northern Ireland and Spain, when he was listed as an alternate to the 23-player squad.

He was first recognised in Slovak senior national team nomination in November 2022 by Francesco Calzona being listed as an alternate for two friendly fixtures against Montenegro and Marek Hamšík's retirement game against Chile. In December 2022, Veselovský was shortlisted for senior national team prospective players' training camp at NTC Senec.

References

External links
 FC DAC 1904 Dunajská Streda official club profile 
 Futbalnet profile 
 
 

2002 births
Living people
Sportspeople from Plzeň
Slovak footballers
Slovakia youth international footballers
Association football midfielders
FC DAC 1904 Dunajská Streda players
FC ŠTK 1914 Šamorín players
Slovak Super Liga players
2. Liga (Slovakia) players